Umma femina is a species of damselfly in the family Calopterygidae. It is endemic to Angola. Its natural habitats are subtropical or tropical moist montane forests and rivers. It is threatened by habitat loss.

References

Endemic fauna of Angola
Calopterygidae
Odonata of Africa
Insects described in 1947
Taxonomy articles created by Polbot